"Little Black Book" is the fourth and final single from American singer Belinda Carlisle's fourth studio album, Live Your Life Be Free (1991). Released on August 17, 1992, it was Carlisle's first single containing a co-writing credit from her. American singer-songwriter Sheryl Crow performs the background vocals under the name "Cherryl Crowe". One of the single's B-side, "The Air You Breathe", was originally performed by Stéphanie in 1991 under the title "You Don't Die from Love".

Track listings
UK 7-inch single
A. "Little Black Book"
B. "Only a Dream"

UK CD1 and Australian CD single
 "Little Black Book"
 "Only a Dream"
 "The Air You Breathe"

UK CD2
 "Little Black Book" (Little Black mix)
 "Little Black Book" (Belinda's in the House mix)
 "Little Black Book"
 "The Air You Breathe"

UK cassette single
A. "Little Black Book"
B. "The Air You Breathe"

Music video
The music video was directed by Scott Kalvert.

Charts

References

Belinda Carlisle 1991 singles at BelindaVault

1992 singles
Belinda Carlisle songs
Songs written by Marcella Detroit
Songs written by Belinda Carlisle
Song recordings produced by Rick Nowels
MCA Records singles
Virgin Records singles
Songs written by Richard Feldman (songwriter)
1991 songs
Sheryl Crow